The 1946 United States Senate election in Tennessee was held on November 5, 1946. Incumbent Democratic Senator Kenneth D. McKellar was re-elected to a sixth term in office. He defeated a primary challenge by Edward W. Carmack Jr. and easily won the general election against Republican William B. Ladd.

Democratic primary

Candidates
Edward W. Carmack Jr., candidate for Senate in 1942 and son of former Senator Edward W. Carmack
Byron Johnson
Kenneth McKellar, incumbent Senator since 1917 and President pro tempore of the U.S. Senate
John Randolph Neal Jr., attorney, academic, and perennial candidate
Herman H. Ross

Results

General election

Candidates
William B. Ladd (Republican)
Kenneth McKellar, incumbent Senator since 1917 (Democratic)
John Randolph Neal Jr., attorney, academic, and perennial candidate (Independent)
Herman H. Ross (Independent)

Results

See also
1946 United States Senate elections

References

1946
Tennessee
United States Senate